Torrens Road is an arterial road in the northwestern suburbs of Adelaide, Australia. The road is aligned southeast to northwest and is parallel with Port Road for most of its length.

Route
It commences at the City Ring Route along the edge of North Adelaide, and heads northwest. Major roads that intersect Torrens Road include Churchill Road (A22), South Road, and Regency Road. It meets the Outer Harbor railway line in Rosewater, and ceases a short distance later, a couple of hundred metres south of Grand Junction Road (A16).

The short section between Park Terrace and Churchill Road at the southeastern end of Torrens Road is designated route A22, which then follows Churchill Road. An overpass of the Gawler and Port Augusta railways is currently under construction to eliminate the level crossing; it sees an average of 23,000 vehicles a day, and the level crossing gates can be down for 22% of the time during peak hours.

The former Cheltenham Park Racecourse (now the residential suburb of St Clair) and Armada Arndale Shopping Centre are both located on Torrens Road.

Major intersections

See also

References

Roads in Adelaide